The Ningdu revolt, also known as the Ningdu uprising, was a rebellion by the 26th Route Army of the National Revolutionary Army of the Republic of China in Ningdu County, Jiangxi Province on December 14, 1931. 17,000 soldiers of the 26th Route Army defected from the Kuomintang to the Chinese Workers' and Peasants' Red Army of the Chinese Communist Party.
After the conclusion of the Central Plains War, the 5th Route Army of the Northwest Army, formerly under the command of Feng Yuxiang, was redesignated as the 26th Route Army and brought the direct control of the Nationalist Government of Chiang Kai-shek. Sun Lianzhong was made commander of this army. Members of this unit had contacts with the communists dating to the Northern Expedition. When the 26th Route Army was brought to participate in the campaign against the Jiangxi Soviet, plans were made to bring members to the communist side. In November 1931, a telegram from the Nationalist Government to Sun was received by the deputy army commander and chief of staff, Zhao Bosheng. Zhao was secret member of the communist party. Zhao contacted the commanders of the 26th Route Army, 25th Division's 73rd and 74th Brigade to plot an uprising. The two brigade commanders agreed to the plan and contacted the communists, who sent Wang Jiaxiang and Zuo Quan with the 12th Division of the Red 4th Army to assist them. On December 14, the 26th Route Army, with the exception of one regiment of its 25th Division (division commander Liu opposed the uprising) went over to the communists. On December 16, they reached the territory controlled by the Jiangxi Soviet and was made the Red 5th Army Corps. Zhao and the two brigade commanders died later during the Chinese Civil War, but those who helped them were prominent later, including Ji Pengfei and Huang Zhen.

References

Chinese Civil War
Rebellions in China
1931 in China
Chinese defectors